Kitty Wells' & Red Foley's Golden Favorites is an album of duets by Kitty Wells and Red Foley. It was released in 1961 on the Decca label (DL 4109).

The album is a compilation of singles released by Wells and Foley during the 1950s. Several of the songs were hits on the country charts, including "One by One" (Juke Box #1, 1954), "I'm a Stranger in My Home" (Jockey #12, 1954), "As Long As I Live" (Juke Box #3, 1955), "Make Believe" (Jukebox #6, 1955), "You and Me" (Juke Box #3, Jockey #3, 1956), and "No One But You" (Best Seller flip, Juke Box flip, 1956).

The album was released as part of Decca's "All Time Golden Favorites", a series of albums compiling hit records from the label's stars.

Track listing
Side 1
 "One by One"
 "Just Call Me Lonesome"
 "As Long as I Live"
 "A Wedding Ring Ago"
 "Make Believe"
 "Candy Kisses" (George Morgan)

Side 2
 "You and Me"
 "Memory of a Love"
 "I'm a Stranger in My Home"
 "I'm Throwing Rice (At the Girl I Love)"
 "No One but You"
 "I'm Counting On You"

References

1961 compilation albums
Kitty Wells albums
Red Foley albums